Walter Boehlich (16 September 1921 – 6 April 2006) was a German journalist, literary critic, literary editor and translator.

Life

Walter Boehlich was born in Breslau, Silesia, as a son of writer Ernst Boehlich. During the Nazi regime, Boelich was discriminated at school because of his Jewish background. After World War II, he read philology at the University of Bonn and became the assistant of Prof. Ernst Robert Curtius, an expert on Romance studies and literary theory.

He worked as literary critic for the weekly newspaper Die Zeit and for the Frankfurter Allgemeine Zeitung. As chief editor at Suhrkamp Verlag, he played a crucial part in making Suhrkamp a leading publishing house of German post-war literature and theory.

After he had left Suhrkamp after an argument over editors' participation rights in 1968, Boehlich wrote for the German magazine, Kursbuch. His pamphlet Autodafé on literature and its socio-historical background was published as a poster supplement to the magazine in 1968 and became a standard item of wall decoration in students' living communities of the time. Quote:
Criticism is dead. Which one? The bourgeois kind that prevailed. It killed itself, died with the bourgeois world to which it belonged, died with the bourgeois literature that it slapped on the back, died with the bourgeois aesthetics on which it had set its foundations, died with the bourgeois god that had blessed it.

From November 1979 until January 2001, he wrote a monthly political column for the – otherwise satirical – German magazine, Titanic.

Boehlich translated several French, Spanish and Danish books.

Walter Boehlich was a member of the Deutsche Akademie für Sprache und Dichtung (Darmstadt). He received the 1990 Johann Heinrich Merck Prize, the 1997 Jane Scatcherd Translator Prize, the 2001 Heinrich Mann Prize and the Wilhelm-Merton-Preis für Europäische Übersetzungen (Wilhelm Merton Prize for European Translations).

In 2006, he died in Hamburg.

In an obit, literary critic Martin Lüdke wrote in the Frankfurter Rundschau (14 April 2006):
The essence of Suhrkamp Verlag, modern literature and corresponding theory, was owed – amongst others – to him. ... He was an accomplished literature scholar and knowledgeable about theory. That is why he could always tell his colleagues in their face what kind of 'nonsense' they just produced according to his invariably well-grounded opinion.  Once I even saw him winning an argument over Marcel Reich-Ranicki and make him leave gulping and speechlessly. ... Seldom has an author made so many enemies with his analysis, especially among his colleagues who sensed how they were losing ground. With Walter Boehlich, one of the last great intellectuals of the old Federal Republic has died. Even though he had many enemies, there are many who have to be thankful to him – and are.

Works

1848. Frankfurt am Main 1973.

Editor
Marcel Proust: Briefe zum Werk (Letters to Work), Frankfurt am Main 1964
Der Berliner Antisemitismusstreit (The Berlin Anti-semitism Argument), Frankfurt am Main 1965 et al.
Georg Gottfried Gervinus: Einleitung in die Geschichte des neunzehnten Jahrhunderts (Introduction to the History of the 19th Century), Frankfurt am Main 1967
Der Hochverratsprozeß gegen Gervinus (The High Treason Case against Gervinus), Frankfurt am Main 1967
Karl Gutzkow: Deutschland am Vorabend seines Falles oder seiner Größe (Germany on the Eve of its Fall of its Greatness), Frankfurt am Main 1969
Thomas Mann: Schriften zur Politik (Writings on Politics), Frankfurt am Main 1970
Hjalmar Söderberg: Doktor Glas, Reinbek bei Hamburg 1992
Sigmund Freud: Jugendbriefe an Eduard Silberstein (Youth Letters of Eduard Silberstein), Frankfurt am Main 1989
David Friedrich Strauss: ''Soirées de Grandval, Berlin 1996

Translations
Herman Bang: Eine Geschichte vom Glück (A History of Luck), Berlin 1993
Herman Bang: Sommerfreuden (Summer Friends), Reinbek bei Hamburg 1993
Herman Bang: Das weiße Haus. Das graue Haus (The White House.  The Grey House), Zürich 1958
Giambattista Basile: Das Märchen aller Märchen (The Fairy Tale of all Fairy Tales), Frankfurt am Main
Steen Steensen Blicher: Bruchstücke aus dem Tagebuch eines Dorfküsters (Fragments from the Diary of a Village Sexton), Berlin 1993
Karen Blixen: On Modern Marriage and Other Observations, Frankfurt am Main 1987
Gabriel Dagan: Die Verabredung (The Appointment), Frankfurt am Main 1986
Régis Debray: The Chilean Revolution, Neuwied [et al.] 1972
Marguerite Duras: The Afternoon of Mr. Andesmas, Frankfurt am Main 1963
Marguerite Duras: Destroy, She Said, Neuwied [et al.] 1970
Jean Giraudoux: Simon, Frankfurt am Main 1961
Víctor Jara: Víctor Jara, Frankfurt am Main 1976
Søren Kierkegaard: Journals, Cologne [et al.] 1955
Vizconde de Lascano Tegui: Von der Anmut im Schlafe (Of the Grace in Sleep), Berlin 1995
Amedeo Modigliani: Modigliani, Stuttgart 1961 (translated together with Silja Wendelstadt)
Die Ostindienfahrer (The East Indian Traveler), Frankfurt am Main 1970
Peter Ronild: Die Körper (The Heads), Frankfurt am Main 1971
Monique Saint-Hélier: Die Weisen aus dem Morgenland (The Ways of the Morning Land), Frankfurt am Main 1958
Ramón José Sender: Requiem für einen spanischen Landmann (Requiem for a Spanish Statesman), Frankfurt am Main 1964
Ramón José Sender: Der Verschollene (The Missing), Frankfurt am Main 1961
Hjalmar Söderberg: Evening Star, Frankfurt am Main 1980
Hjalmar Söderberg: Gertrud, Frankfurt am Main 1980
Lope de Vega Carpio: Die Irren von Valencia (The Stray of Valencia), Frankfurt am Main 1967
Virginia Woolf: Mrs. Dalloway, Frankfurt am Main 1997

External links
 Literature by and on Walter Boehlich in the Catalog of the German National Library
 Obituary in the Jungle World

1921 births
2006 deaths
German literary critics
German male journalists
Journalists from Wrocław
Heinrich Mann Prize winners
People from the Province of Lower Silesia
20th-century German translators
20th-century German male writers
20th-century Polish journalists